Humberht (also Humbearht, Hunbearht, Humberrht, Humbreht, Humbrhth, Hunbercht, Hunberht, Hunberhtus, Humberhtus, Hunbrht or Hunberght) is an Anglo-Saxon name that may refer to:

 Hunberght (died c. 830), bishop of Lichfield
 Humberht of the Tomsaete (fl. 835–866), Mercian nobleman
 Hunbeorht (died 870) a.k.a. Humbertus, bishop of Elmham

See also
 Humbert, Germanic given name and surname